This is a list of Panjabi films of 2008.

List of films

References

External links 
 Punjabi films at the Internet Movie Database

2008
Punjabi